State Highway 82, abbreviated to SH-82 or OK-82, is a state highway in Oklahoma.

Route description

Southern section
The southern SH-82 begins at SH-1 and SH-63 in Le Flore County west of Talihina. It then heads north from there, entering Latimer County and running along the west side of Bengal. Near Red Oak, it shares a brief concurrency US-270.  North of there, it runs east of the Sansbois Mountains, meeting SH-31 at Lequire. From there, SH-82 continues north until the southern section ends at a junction with SH-9 in Stigler.

Northern section
The northern SH-82 begins at Interstate 40 exit 297 just south of Vian. In Vian, SH-82 meets US-64. Six miles north of Vian, SH-82 runs through Box before meeting SH-100 and forming a concurrency with it on the east shore of Lake Tenkiller. After splitting from SH-100, SH-82 heads through Keys before forming another concurrency, this time with US-62 and SH-10. The highways then enter Tahlequah, where SH-82 splits off from the other two routes.

SH-82 runs through downtown Tahlequah before meeting SH-51 SPUR in the northwestern part of the city. SH-82 turns northwest, running through Gideon and Peggs. It has an interchange with the Cherokee Turnpike south of Locust Grove. In Locust Grove, it meets Alternate U.S. Highway 412. It then heads towards Salina, where it begins a concurrency with SH-20. The two routes split up after running through Spavinaw. SH-82 then has a brief concurrency with SH-28 west of Langley. It serves as the western terminus of SH-85 west of Ketchum. SH-82 itself ends seven miles (11 km) north of there at a junction with US-60/69 east of Vinita.

SH-82A

State Highway 82A was the sole suffixed highway spur branching from SH-82. It began at SH-82 (3rd Street) in Langley, following Cherokee Street to the east. It then angled northeastward to end at SH-28 near Pensacola Dam.

SH-82A was removed from the state highway system on March 5, 2018.

Junction list

Southern section

Northern section

References

External links

 Southern SH-82 at OKHighways
 Northern SH-82 at OKHighways

082
Transportation in Le Flore County, Oklahoma
Transportation in Latimer County, Oklahoma
Transportation in Haskell County, Oklahoma
Transportation in Sequoyah County, Oklahoma
Transportation in Cherokee County, Oklahoma
Transportation in Mayes County, Oklahoma
Transportation in Craig County, Oklahoma